Nanchoff is a surname. Notable people with the surname include:

George Nanchoff (born 1955), American soccer player
Louis Nanchoff (born 1956), American soccer player, brother of George
Michael Nanchoff (born 1988), American soccer player and coach, son of George